Carpool Karaoke: The Series is an American streaming television series that premiered on Apple Music on August 9, 2017. Based on the recurring segment, Carpool Karaoke, from The Late Late Show with James Corden, the series pairs various celebrities with each other as they drive around together and sing-along to popular music. On February 15, 2018, it was announced that the series had been renewed for a second season which premiered on October 12, 2018, on Apple TV. On August 17, 2021, it was announced that the series had been renewed for a fifth season and would be moving to Apple TV+. The fifth season premiered on May 27, 2022.

Premise
In each episode of Carpool Karaoke: The Series, "celebrities will ride along and sing along...as they visit places meaningful to the celebrity, sing tunes from their personal playlists and surprise fans who don’t expect to see big stars belting out tunes one lane over."

Episodes

Season 1 (2017–18)

Season 2 (2018–19)

Season 3 (2020)

Season 4 (2021)

Season 5 (2022)

Production

Development
On July 26, 2016, Apple Music and CBS Television Studios announced that they had reached a deal for an exclusive first-window licensing agreement under which Apple Music would be the global home of a television series adaptation of the popular recurring segment, Carpool Karaoke from the Late Late Show with James Corden. It was further reported that production companies CBS Television Studios and Fulwell 73 would produce the series. James Corden and Ben Winston are the creators and executive producers for the series. Before the deal was reached, CBS Studios International and Fulwell 73 had been shopping the series for an international home. It was also initially announced that the series would have a host that would appear in every episode. On January 9, 2017, it was reported that the series would not feature a single host and instead would have a different host every episode.

On February 15, 2018, it was announced that the series had been renewed for a second season. On May 26, 2018, it was reported that an episode of season two would feature cast members from Star Trek: Discovery including Sonequa Martin-Green, Mary Wiseman, Anthony Rapp, and Doug Jones. On October 9, 2018, it was announced that season two would premiere on October 12, 2018. Episodes were set to feature guest stars including Jason Sudeikis with The Muppets, The Lonely Island with "Weird Al" Yankovic, Snoop Dogg with Matthew McConaughey, Rashida Jones with her father Quincy Jones, Tyra Banks, and Jamie Foxx with his daughter Corinne Foxx. It was then announced that beginning with season two, the series was expected to move to the Apple TV app with new episodes being released on Fridays through December 2018 and then resuming again after the holidays. On August 17, 2021, it was announced that the series had been renewed for a fifth season and would be moving to Apple TV+.

Filming
In March 2018, an episode featuring James Marsden and Evan Rachel Wood, both of whom star on the HBO series Westworld, was filmed in Austin, Texas during the annual South by Southwest Film Festival.

Release

Marketing
On February 13, 2017, Apple released the first teaser trailer for the series and a few days later, the first full-length trailer was released. On October 9, 2018, the official trailer for season two was released.

International versions

Premiere
After initially being set to premiere in April 2017, it was announced on April 25, 2017, that the series would be delayed to sometime later in the year. On May 30, 2017, it was announced that the show's official premiere date would be August 8, 2017.

Reception

Critical reception
The first season received a mixed to negative reception from critics upon its premiere. Sonya Saralya of Variety commented "For a segment that emphasized spontaneity and intimacy, Carpool Karaoke on Apple Music feels distancing--highlighting how dissimilar the guests are from the audience, instead of the other way around." Rebecca Nicholson of The Guardian was also negative in her review saying, "Apple has supersized [Corden's] formula but, in doing so, has managed to misunderstand entirely what it is that made it charming. Judging by the first episode and what’s teased later in the series, this is less about getting a revealing interview out of someone who may otherwise seem distant, and more about bowing down to the power of celebrity."

Awards and nominations

See also
 List of Apple TV+ original programming

References

External links

2017 American television series debuts
2010s American reality television series
2020s American reality television series
Apple TV+ original programming
English-language television shows
American non-fiction web series
American television spin-offs
Sing-along television shows
Television shows remade overseas
Non-American television series based on American television series
Television series by CBS Studios
The Late Late Show with James Corden